The Campeonato Catarinense de Futebol de 2019 da Série A, known as the 2019 Campeonato Catarinense, was the 94th season of Santa Catarina's top-flight football league. The season began on 16 January and ended on 21 April.

Avaí won on penalties their 17th title after beating Chapecoense in the final.

The defending champions were Figueirense but they were eliminated by Chapecoense in the semi-final.

Format
The tournament was contested between 10 teams, who first played in a double round-robin in which the bottom two teams were relegated to next year's Série B. The final stage was a single-legged bracket contested by the top four teams. Only two places were available in the 2020 Copa do Brasil, while three places were available in the 2020 Série D.

Participating teams

First phase

Table

Results

Final phase

Bracket

Semifinals

Final

General table

Top goalscorers

References

Campeonato Catarinense seasons